Pedro Centeno Baquero (born 1970 in Manila) is a Filipino clergyman and bishop for the Roman Catholic Diocese of Kerema. He was appointed bishop in 2017.

References

Filipino Roman Catholic bishops
Roman Catholic bishops of Kerema
Clergy from Manila
1970 births
Living people
Date of birth missing (living people)
21st-century Filipino Roman Catholic priests